Patrick Andrew McAlinney (9 November 1913 – 22 August 1990) was an Irish character actor who starred in many British dramas and sitcoms. His most memorable roles included a brother on the hit sitcom Oh, Brother!, which starred Derek Nimmo, Mr. O'Reilly in The Tomorrow People and Dr. Daley in Bless Me, Father.

His stage work included the original production of Thornton Wilder's The Matchmaker in London's West End, and its subsequent fourteen month Broadway run, in 1945–1947.

Early life
Patrick Andrew "Paddy" McAlinney was born in Lammy near Omagh, County Tyrone, Ireland on 9 November 1913; he was the son of farmer Patrick McAlinney and Anastasia O'Neill.

Filmography

References

External links

1913 births
1990 deaths
People from Omagh
Irish male stage actors
Irish male film actors
Irish male television actors
Place of death missing
20th-century Irish male actors
Irish expatriates in the United Kingdom